Nathan Fillion (born March 27, 1971) is a Canadian-American actor. He played the leading roles of Captain Malcolm "Mal" Reynolds on Firefly and its film continuation Serenity, and Richard Castle on Castle. , he stars as John Nolan on The Rookie.

Fillion has acted in traditionally distributed films like Slither and Trucker, Internet-distributed films like Dr. Horrible's Sing-Along Blog, television soap operas, sitcoms and theater. His voice is also featured in animation and video games, such as Hal Jordan/Green Lantern in various DC Comics projects, the Bungie games Halo 3, Halo 3: ODST, Halo: Reach, Destiny and Destiny 2, along with the 343 Industries game Halo 5: Guardians, and Wonder Man in Marvel's Guardians of the Galaxy Vol. 2 (2017) and M.O.D.O.K. (2021).

Fillion first gained recognition for his work on One Life to Live in the contract role of Joey Buchanan, for which he was nominated for the Daytime Emmy Award for Outstanding Younger Actor in a Drama Series, as well as for his supporting role as Johnny Donnelly in the sitcom Two Guys and a Girl.

Early life
Fillion was born on March 27, 1971, in Edmonton, Alberta, the younger of two sons of Robert "Bob" Fillion and June "Cookie" Early, both retired English teachers. Both sides of his father's family were part of the Quebec diaspora in Fall River, Massachusetts, and his mother had a Norwegian maternal grandfather and a Finnish maternal grandmother.

Fillion was raised in Edmonton's Mill Woods neighbourhood and completed his secondary and post-secondary education in Edmonton, attending Holy Trinity Catholic High School, Concordia University College of Alberta, and the University of Alberta, where he was a member of the Kappa Alpha Society. He has been a U.S. citizen since 1997.

Career

1994–2009
After working in several theatre, television, and film productions, including Theatresports with Rapid Fire Theatre and the improvised soap opera Die-Nasty, Fillion moved to New York City in 1994 where he acted in the soap opera One Life to Live as Joey Buchanan, for which he was nominated in 1996 for a Daytime Emmy Award for Outstanding Younger Actor in a Drama Series. In 1997, he left the series to pursue other projects (returning for a brief guest appearance in 2007).

After moving to Los Angeles, he played a supporting role in the sitcom Two Guys, a Girl, and a Pizza Place, and was cast as James Frederick "The Minnesota" Ryan in Steven Spielberg's Saving Private Ryan.

In 2002, Fillion starred as Captain Malcolm Reynolds in the Joss Whedon science fiction television series Firefly, for which he won the Cinescape Genre Face of the FutureMale award by the Academy of Science Fiction, Fantasy & Horror Films, USA. Fillion also won the Syfy Genre Awards in 2006 for Best Actor/Television and was runner-up for Best Actor/Movie. Fillion called his time on Firefly the best acting job he ever had, and compares every job he has had to it. Although the show was cancelled, it was adapted to the big screen; he reprised his role as Mal in Whedon's film Serenity (2005).

In 2003, Fillion had a recurring role as Caleb in the final five episodes of Joss Whedon's series Buffy the Vampire Slayer.

Fillion lent his voice to the animated series King of the Hill in 2001, the video game Jade Empire (as the voice of Gao the Lesser), and the animated series Justice League Unlimited (as Vigilante in the episodes "Hunter's Moon" and "Patriot Act") in 2005–06. He portrayed Green Lantern/Hal Jordan in Green Lantern: Emerald Knights, Justice League: Doom, Justice League: The Flashpoint Paradox and Justice League: Throne of Atlantis and The Death of Superman. Fillion starred in James Gunn's 2006 horror film Slither. For his starring role as Bill Pardy, he garnered a 2006 Fangoria Chainsaw Awards nomination in the category of Dude You Don't Wanna Mess With.

Fillion starred in the romantic comedy film Waitress, written and directed by Adrienne Shelly, which premiered at the Sundance Film Festival on January 21, 2007, and opened in theaters on May 2, 2007.  Fillion starred in White Noise 2: The Light. He made one appearance in the 2006–2007 season of the television show Lost, as Kevin, Kate's ex-husband.

In October 2006, Fillion signed a talent holding contract with the Fox Broadcasting Company, and in December 2006, The Hollywood Reporter confirmed that Fillion was cast as Alex Tully in the series Drive, which debuted on Fox in the spring of 2007. Drive was created by Tim Minear. Ivan Sergei played Alex Tully in the original pilot episode of Drive. The first two Drive episodes premiered on April 13, 2007, in Canada (April 15, 2007, in the United States). However, the show did not deliver the ratings Fox desired, and on April 25, 2007, the network announced that the series was cancelled.
The final two produced episodes were supposed to air back-to-back on Fox in July 2007 but did not actually become available until July 15 when they were posted on the Drive MySpace page.

Fillion reprised his 1990s role as One Life to Live Joey for the series' 9,999th and 10,000th episodes, aired August 16 and 17, 2007.

Fillion joined the cast of ABC's Desperate Housewives at the beginning of the fall 2007 season (season 4), portraying Dr. Adam Mayfair. His first appearance was in the episode "Now You Know", which aired on September 30, 2007. His final appearance was the final episode of season 4, in 2008.

Fillion voiced the role of an ODST Gunnery sergeant in the Xbox 360 game Halo 3, alongside fellow Firefly stars Alan Tudyk and Adam Baldwin. At one point early in the first mission, he identifies himself as "[Sergeant] Reynolds" over the radio, referring to his character's name from the TV series Firefly. All three actors are given personalities in the game that match those of their characters from Firefly. He provides the voice, portrayed likeness, and motion capture performance for Gunnery Sergeant Edward Buck in Halo 3: ODST, Halo 5: Guardians, and a brief appearance in Halo: Reach.

2009–2018

In March 2009, the first episode of the ABC television series Castle aired, in which Fillion starred as the titular character Richard Castle, a mystery novelist who helps the NYPD solve (frequently bizarre) murders. In 2009, Fillion was nominated for Satellite Award for Best Actor – Television Series Drama for his performance in Castle. The show was cancelled by ABC in 2016, with the final episode airing on May 16 of that year.

BuddyTV ranked him No. 10 on its list of "TV's 100 Sexiest Men of 2009", No. 19 in 2010, No. 20 in 2011 and No. 39 in 2012; No. 7 on its list of "The 15 Best Drama Lead Actors of the 2011-2012 TV Season"; named his character's relationship with the other main character as No. 18 (and the Best Flirting Relationship) on its list "Love Is All Around: Best TV Relationships of 2010", No. 13 (and the Best Delayed Relationship) on its list of "The Best Relationships of 2011", No. 15 on its list of "The Special Relationships: TV's Top 50 Love Stories of the Past Decade", No. 1 on its list "Love... Or Not: The Top 12 Will-They-or-Won't-They Couples of 2012" and No. 2 on its list "Lip Smacking Good: The Best Kisses of 2012"; named Castle as No. 6 on its list of "The 11 Best Returning TV Shows of 2011", No. 11 on "The 15 Best Dramas of the 2011-2012 TV Season" and No. 12 on "The 12 Best Dramas of 2012".

Fillion was featured in a spoof porn web video on Spike called "Nailing Your Wife", part of James Gunn's PG Porn series. Fillion made a brief cameo appearance in the season 5 episode "Revolving Doors" of the web series The Guild. In late September 2011, Fillion guest starred as the Action Sports 1 anchor in the web series Husbands. He played Dogberry in the independent film Much Ado About Nothing (2012), based on the Shakespeare play of the same name, written, directed and produced by Joss Whedon.

Since 2011, Fillion has appeared as the recurring Space Western character Cactoid Jim in performances of the podcasted live show The Thrilling Adventure Hour, a stage show premised on the idea that actors are performing as characters in a radio show. The character of Cactoid Jim first appeared as part of the recurring segment "Sparks Nevada, Marshal on Mars", but was soon given his own segment, called "Cactoid Jim: King of the Martian Frontier". Fillion has advertised his participation as a guest star on The Thrilling Adventure Hour by means of including filmed elements of the live show on the DVD set for season 4 of Castle.

In 2012, he appeared in the episode "The Daly Superheroes" of the web series The Daly Show. On February 17, 2013, Fillion hosted the 2013 WGA West Coast Awards.

In 2014 he appeared in the video game Destiny as the character Cayde-6. Over the next few years his role became larger with expansions to the game. Fillion returned to the role in the 2017 sequel Destiny 2, and featured prominently in the game until the release of Forsaken, where the character was instead voiced by Nolan North up to his death.

In 2015 and 2016, Fillion worked with Alan Tudyk on a web series called Con Man, loosely based on their experiences on the convention circuit after Firefly.

In 2017, Fillion was cast in the recurring role of Gary West on the Netflix horror-comedy series Santa Clarita Diet. In the same year, Fillion was cast in the recurring role of Jacques Snicket on the second season of the Netflix comedy drama series A Series of Unfortunate Events.

In February 2018, Fillion was cast to star as John Nolan in the new ABC TV series The Rookie, which was created by former Castle executive producer Alexi Hawley.

On July 16, 2018, Fillion and director Allan Ungar released a live action short film based on the Naughty Dog franchise Uncharted. The short immediately went viral and was praised for its witty humor, action, and ability to stay true to the source material. Fans and critics took to social media and began campaigning for Netflix to turn it into a series while referring to it as one of the best adaptations of a video game.

In popular culture

Fillion has been associated with the public artist Martin Firrell since 2009. He is the subject of two works of contemporary public art by Firrell: Complete Hero (digital projections of text and video portraiture to the West and North elevations of the Guards Chapel, Wellington Barracks, London, 2009) and Metascifi (a digital app investigating American television science fiction series for ideas and strategies for living well).

Fillion was the 'face' of Complete Hero. The artist explained the choice of Fillion as follows: "I wanted to make a piece of work that looked at all kinds of heroism, not just the usual derring-do of white square-jawed men. But I thought it would be interesting to start with a white, square-jawed man and Nathan Fillion agreed to take part."

In Metascifi, Fillion discusses the deeper significance of his Firefly character Captain Mal Reynolds, reflecting on some of the universal preoccupations of any human life: death, love, evil, intimacy, power, vulnerability, violence and freedom.

For August 7 and 8, 2021, the Edmonton city hall was renamed the Nathan Fillion Civilian Pavilion after a petition from fans with over 27,000 signatures and support from Fillion's costars in The Suicide Squad.

Philanthropy
In 2007, Fillion and author PJ Haarsma co-founded the non-profit organization Kids Need to Read, to help inspire children's imaginations by getting more books into underfunded libraries.

Fillion's association with Charity: Water garnered over $60,000 worth of donations in 2019.

Filmography

Film

Television

Web

Video games

Audiobook

Podcast

Accolades

References

External links

 
 

1971 births
20th-century Canadian male actors
21st-century Canadian male actors
Canadian emigrants to the United States
Canadian male film actors
Canadian male soap opera actors
Canadian male television actors
Canadian male video game actors
Canadian male voice actors
American people of Scandinavian descent
Living people
Male actors from Edmonton
Canadian people of French descent
Canadian people of Norwegian descent
Canadian people of Finnish descent
20th-century American male actors
21st-century American male actors
American male film actors
Male actors from Alberta
American male soap opera actors
American male television actors
American male video game actors
American male voice actors
American people of French-Canadian descent
American people of Norwegian descent
American people of Finnish descent
University of Alberta alumni
Canadian expatriate male actors in the United States
People with acquired American citizenship
Shorty Award winners